Escan Tower was a mixed-use skyscraper proposed to be built along Sheikh Zayed Road, in Dubai, United Arab Emirates. The tower would be 60 storeys high, with 40 residential floors and 20 floors for commercial purposes. The tower was initially expected to be completed by 2011, but it was cancelled in the wake of the 2007 Financial crisis.

See also
Sheikh Zayed Road
List of tallest buildings in Dubai

References

Official Website
Ameinfo.com
Emporis.com
Arabianbusiness.com
Zawya.com
Aci-dubai.net

Proposed skyscrapers in Dubai